Dunstall is a village in Staffordshire, England.

Dunstall may also refer to:

People
 Jason Dunstall (born 1964), Australian rules footballer 
 John Dunstall (died 1693), engraver

Other
 Dunstall, DMV at SK880939
 Dunstall Common, village in Worcestershire, England
 Dunstall Hall, mansion in Staffordshire
 Dunstall Hill, inner-city area of Wolverhampton
 Norton Dunstall, motorcycle